Judgement 2008 was a professional wrestling event promoted by DDT Pro-Wrestling (DDT). It took place on March 9, 2008, in Tokyo, Japan, at the Korakuen Hall. It was the twelfth event under the Judgement name. The event aired domestically on Fighting TV Samurai.

Storylines
Judgement 2008 featured eight professional wrestling matches that involved different wrestlers from pre-existing scripted feuds and storylines. Wrestlers portrayed villains, heroes, or less distinguishable characters in the scripted events that built tension and culminated in a wrestling match or series of matches.

Event
The second match was for Muscle Sakai's personal belt, which was not a championship recognized by DDT. The match could be won by taking the belt off Sakai's waist.

Next, Gentaro acted as the special guest referee for a match between Michael Nakazawa and Tomomitsu Matsunaga. Nakazawa quickly went for a spear but Matsunaga dodged the attack and Nakazawa hit Gentaro instead which caused Nakazawa's disqualification in just 21 seconds after the bell. Gentaro then accepted Nakazawa's request for a rematch.

After the defeat of Kota Ibushi's team in the sixth match, Danshoku Dino took advantage of the fact that Ibushi was asleep backstage to pin him in order to become the new Ironman Heavymetalweight Champion.

Next was an eight-man tag team match dubbed "DDT 11th Anniversary Memorial Match" that saw the return of Mikami.

Results

Three-way elimination match

References

External links
The official DDT Pro-Wrestling website

2008
2008 in professional wrestling
Professional wrestling in Tokyo